Miklós Haraszti (born 2 January 1945, Jerusalem) is a Hungarian politician, writer, journalist, human rights advocate and university professor. He served the maximum of two terms as the OSCE Representative on Freedom of the Media from 2004 to 2010. Currently he is Adjunct Professor at the School of International & Public Affairs of Columbia Law School, New York and visiting professor at the Central European University (CEU), Department of Public Policy.

Biography
Haraszti studied philosophy and literature at Budapest University. In 1976 he co-founded the Hungarian Democratic Opposition Movement and in 1980 he became editor of the samizdat periodical Beszélő.

In 1989, Haraszti participated in the "roundtable" negotiations on transition to free elections. A member of the Hungarian Parliament from 1990–1994, he then moved on to lecture on democratization and media politics at numerous universities.

Haraszti's books include A Worker in a Worker's State and The Velvet Prison, both of which have been translated into several languages.

In 2012, Haraszti was appointed UN Special Rapporteur on the situation of human rights in Belarus.

Personal life
He is married. His wife is Antónia Szenthe. They have two daughters.

Selected publications

Essays
 "The Hungarian Independent Peace Movement". Telos 61 (Fall 1984). New York: Telos Press

References

1945 births
Living people
Hungarian Jews
Organization for Security and Co-operation in Europe
United Nations special rapporteurs
Alliance of Free Democrats politicians
Members of the National Assembly of Hungary (1990–1994)
Human rights in Belarus
International Writing Program alumni
Hungarian officials of the United Nations